Karabudak can refer to:

 Karabudak, Çınar
 Karabudak, Hınıs